The Battle of Amritsar took place on 17 January 1767 between the Durranis and the Sikh Misls during Ahmad Shah Abdali's eighth campaign into India. Durrani commander Jahan Khan marched to the neighborhood of Chak where he was met by the Sikhs who became aware of Khan's movements. A battle ensued where the Afghans suffered between 5,000 to 6,000 casualties.

Background
Ahmad Shah Abdali marched his eighth campaign into India and reached Lahore on 22 December 1766. After Abdali marched to Sirhind from Lahore to go after the Sikhs, the Sikhs attacked and plundered his baggage near Lahore which caused Abdali to hurry back to protect the city. On 17 January 1767, Jahan Khan who had already faced many setbacks because of the Sikhs, marched towards Amritsar with 15,000 Afghans soldiers, where he was met by the Sikhs who were alerted of his movements. Battle took place where the Sikhs fell upon Jahan Khan and his forces.

Battle
When Jahan Khan and his soldiers came across the Sikhs, a battle took place for 3 hours which resulted in Jahan Khan’s retreat and 5000 to 6000 Afghan soldiers killed and wounded.

Aftermath
Upon hearing reports of Jahan Khan’s defeat by the Sikhs, Ahmed Shah Abdali left his baggage on the bank of the Beas at Jalalabad and rushed to assist Jahan Khan, but the Sikhs ended up carrying most of Ahmad Shah’s goods. The British were pleased and relieved with the news of Sikh victory as they suspected that Ahmad Shah Abdali’s aim for this latest campaign into India, was to assist Mir Qasim against the British. Lord Clive stated that if the Sikhs kept the ongoing of plunder of Abdali’s baggage and cutting of his supplies, then Abdali would be ruined and return back to his country.

References 

Battles involving the Durrani Empire
Battles involving the Sikhs